José Ismael Díaz (died 1980) was a Salvadoran footballer.

Club career
Nicknamed el Cisco, Díaz played for C.D. Dragón before joining the Juan Francisco Barraza-managed Águila.

International career
Díaz played for his country's Olympic team in the 1972 and 1976 qualifiers and represented El Salvador in 3 FIFA World Cup qualification matches

Death
In 1980, Díaz was murdered in San Miguel, while working in his taxi.

References

Year of birth missing
1976 deaths
People from San Miguel, El Salvador
Association football forwards
Salvadoran footballers
El Salvador international footballers
C.D. Águila footballers
Male murder victims
People murdered in El Salvador
Salvadoran murder victims
1976 crimes in El Salvador
1976 murders in North America
1970s murders in El Salvador